The Love & Hip Hop franchise has spawned 19 television specials broadcast on VH1, featuring cast members from Love & Hip Hop: New York, Love & Hip Hop: Atlanta, Love & Hip Hop: Hollywood and Love & Hip Hop: Miami.

The franchise focuses on the personal and professional lives of several hip hop and R&B recording artists, music executives and record producers residing in various metropolitan areas of the United States.

Specials

References

External links
 Love & Hip Hop: New York
 Love & Hip Hop: Atlanta
 Love & Hip Hop: Hollywood
 Love & Hip Hop: Miami

 
Lists of American reality television series episodes